The Olympic Federation of Ireland or OFI (called the Irish Olympic Council until 1952 and the Olympic Council of Ireland until 2018) is the National Olympic Committee (NOC) of the island of Ireland. Athletes from Northern Ireland have the option of participating under its auspices or in the Great Britain Olympic Team. Its mission statement is "To manage and enhance the performance of Team Ireland at Olympic Games whilst developing the Olympic Movement in Ireland." In 2018 the Olympic Council of Ireland was renamed as the Olympic Federation of Ireland.

History

The Olympic Federation of Ireland is the new name for the Olympic Council of Ireland, since 15 September 2018. The Irish Olympic Council was founded in 1920, while the Irish War of Independence was pitting the Irish Republic proclaimed by Sinn Féin against the Dublin Castle administration of the United Kingdom of Great Britain and Ireland.  John J. Keane, who was the head of the athletics committee of the Gaelic Athletic Association, met Sinn Féin leaders Arthur Griffith and Michael Collins in Vaughan's Hotel, Parnell Square, in April to discuss the possibility of a separate Irish team at the 1920 Olympics in Antwerp. The founding Council members were mostly Irish republican or nationalist political leaders. Keane wrote to the Baron de Coubertin, who was sympathetic, but the Belgian organising committee deferred to the British Olympic Association (BOA), which took the unionist view that Irish competitors should be part of the British team. By August, Keane was proposing that a separate Irish delegation should march under the Union Jack, on the model of Finland at the 1912 Summer Olympics when part of the Russian Empire. The International Olympic Committee (IOC) decided to "suspend all decision until the moment when the Irish question would be solved politically". Keane applied again in April 1922, during the provisional administration that was preparing for the formal establishment of the Irish Free State that December. De Coubertin was worried that the Tailteann Games were intended to rival the Olympics, and the BOA's delegate was unsure of the political outlook in the buildup to the Irish Civil War. Keane allayed these worries such that the Irish Olympic Council was affiliated to the IOC on 3 June 1922.

Most sports affiliated to the Federation are all-island in scope. Two exceptions in 1922 were athletics and cycling, each of which had rival bodies; the prospect of Olympic competition precipitated their merging into a unified National Athletic and Cycling Association (NACA), which affiliated to the Council in 1924. The council has sent a team to all but one of the Summer Olympic Games since 1924. The 1936 Games were boycotted; this was the first Games after the IAAF's 1934 ruling on borders which restricted the NACA's jurisdiction to the Free State. In 1952, the Council changed its own name from "Irish Olympic Council" to "Olympic Council of Ireland" to reinforce its claim to represent the whole island of Ireland rather than merely the Republic. Its team competed as "Eire" in 1948 and "Republic of Ireland" in 1952 before reverting to its preferred name "Ireland" in 1956 after Lord Killanin secured the agreement of Avery Brundage. The OCI and BOA have an agreement that Northern Irish sportspeople may compete for either team.

The Olympic Federation of Ireland has sent teams to most Winter Olympic Games since 1992.

2016 Ticketing Controversy

On 5 August 2016, the day of the 2016 Summer Olympics opening ceremony, police in Rio de Janeiro arrested two people for attempted illegal resale of hundreds of tickets allocated to the OCI. One of the two was employed by THG Sports, which was the OCI's authorised ticket reseller (ATR) in 2012 but not 2016; the OCI denied any involvement. Shane Ross, the Minister for Transport, Tourism and Sport, promised a "robust inquiry". Pro 10 Sports Management, the OCI's 2016 ATR, said the man arrested was working as their agent to distribute tickets which had been paid for legitimately. On 17 August, Pat Hickey, the OCI president, was arrested in Rio in connection with the investigation. The issue, together with the allocation of tickets for other Olympic events, was set for investigation by a non-statutory inquiry headed by retired High Court judge, Mr Justice Carroll Moran.

Operations
The OFI has a small staff under a Chief Executive, and is based at Olympic House in Howth, County Dublin.

Officials
The offices of President and IOC delegate are honorary, as required by the Olympic Charter.

OFI President

Delegates at the IOC

Affiliated Organisations
While the Olympic Charter mandates that the area of jurisdiction of a NOC must coincide with the limits of the country in which it is established and has its headquarters, it does not require this for the national federations of particular sports affiliated to the NOC. Many bodies affiliated to the OCI are organised on an all-island basis, and have selected competitors from Northern Ireland for the Olympics.

The following organisations are affiliated, some of which are very small and share an address at "Sport HQ" in Park West business park:

Notes:

Baseball Ireland was formerly affiliated to the OCI, but is no longer listed since baseball was removed from the list of Olympic sports after 2008.

Social media
The OFI is present on social media, with the Press Office of the Committee running an official Facebook page, as well as Twitter and Instagram accounts. The OFI is also present on YouTube with its own channel.

See also
 Paralympics Ireland – the National Paralympic Committee 
 Ireland at the Olympics

References

Notes

External links
Official website

!
Ireland
Sports governing bodies in Ireland
All-island sports governing bodies in Ireland
1920 establishments in Ireland